John IX of Salm-Kyrburg-Mörchingen (1575–1623) was Wild- and Rhinegrave of Kyrburg and Count of Salm.  He was the son of Otto I (1538–1607) and Ottilie of Nassau-Weilburg (1546-). Many of his relatives served as soldiers in Swedish service, including his brother John Casimir of Salm-Kyrburg (1577–1651).  Because of this, the family was often on the run during the Thirty Years' War.

Marriage and issue 
He had since about 1593 married to Anna Catherine of Criechingen (d. 1638). They had the following children:
 John Casimir (died young)
 John Philip (died in 1638 in the Battle of Rheinfelden)
 married in 1634 Countess Anna Juliane of Erbach-Erbach (1614–1637)
 Otto Louis (1597–1634)
 John X
 George
 Mary Elizabeth (died: after 1626)
 Dorothea Diana (1604–1672)
 married firstly in 1636 Lord Philip Louis of Rappoltstein (born: 22 September 1601 – died: 25 February 1637)
 married secondly in 1640 Count Philip Wolfgang of Hanau-Lichtenberg (1595–1641)
 Anna Amalia (1604–1676) (twin sister of Diana Dorothea)
 married firstly  with Michael of Freyberg, Baron of Justingen and Öpfingen (d. 1641)
 married secondly  with Count Kaspar Bernhard II of Rechenberg and Aichen (1588–1651)

 married thirdly  with Count Hugo of Königsegg-Rothenfels (1596–1666)
 Esther (?)

External links 
 

Counts of Salm
Salm family
1575 births
1623 deaths
16th-century German people
17th-century German people